Unitarian College Manchester is one of two Unitarian seminaries in England. It is based at Luther King House in the Brighton Grove area of Manchester, and its degrees are validated by the University of Manchester.

It prepares students for ministry and lay leadership positions in the Unitarian and Non-Subscribing Presbyterian Churches.

The College provides occasional overseas scholarships for students from kindred churches, particularly from Hungary and Romania (see Unitarian Church of Transylvania). It is part of the Partnership for Theological Education.

History 
It was established in 1854 by the Unitarian Home Mission Board.

Harris Manchester College 
What is now Harris Manchester College, Oxford started off as a dissenting academy based on another one in Warrington. "The Manchester Academy" or "Manchester College", named after its birthplace in 1786, kept the name when it moved to York (1804-1840), and back to Manchester (1840-1853). It then moved to the capital as "Manchester New College, London", in University Hall, Gordon Square (i.e. Dr Williams's Library) 1853–1889. Its final move was to Oxford, where it remained, becoming in 1996 a full constituent college of Oxford University, and adding "Harris" after a donor. It was the move of the original academy to London in 1854 that occasioned the need for a separate establishment in Manchester.

Principals
 John Relly Beard 1854- 
 Alexander Gordon, 1890-1911
 S. H. Mellone, 1911–1921

References

External links
Unitarian College Manchester

Unitarianism in the United Kingdom
Presbyterianism in England
Christianity in Manchester
Organisations based in Manchester
Education in England
Unitarian seminaries
Bible colleges, seminaries and theological colleges in England